Senator Williams may refer to:

Members of the United States Senate
Abram Williams (1832–1911), U.S. Senator from California
George Henry Williams (1823–1910), U.S. Senator from Oregon from 1865 to 1871
George Howard Williams (1871–1963), U.S. Senator from Missouri from 1925 to 1926
Harrison A. Williams (1919–2001), U.S. Senator from New Jersey from 1959 to 1982
Jared W. Williams (1796–1864), U.S. Senator from New Hampshire
Reuel Williams (1783–1862), U.S. Senator from Maine
John J. Williams (politician) (1904–1988), U.S. senator from Delaware from 1947 to 1970
John Sharp Williams (1854–1932), U.S. Senator from Mississippi from 1911 to 1923
John Stuart Williams (1818–1898), U.S. Senator from Kentucky
John Williams (Tennessee politician) (1778–1837), U.S. Senator from Tennessee from 1815 to 1823
Thomas Hickman Williams (1801–1851), U.S. Senator from Mississippi
Thomas Hill Williams (1780–1840), U.S. Senator from Mississippi

United States state senate members
Abraham J. Williams (1781–1839), Missouri State Senate
Alexander B. Williams (1815–?), New York State Senate
Angela Williams (politician), Colorado State Senate
Anthony H. Williams (born 1957), Pennsylvania State Senate
Archibald Williams (judge) (1801–1863), Kansas State Senate
Avon Williams (1921–1993), Tennessee State Senate
Benjamin Williams (Vermont politician) (1876–1957), Vermont State Senate
Benjamin Williams (1751–1814), North Carolina State Senate
Bob Williams (West Virginia politician) (born 1951), West Virginia State Senate
Brian Williams (Missouri politician) (born 1983), Missouri State Senate
Carol Williams (politician) (born 1949), Montana State Senate
Charles G. Williams (1829–1892), Wisconsin State Senate
Charles Williams (Wisconsin state legislator) (1844–1922), State Senate
Constance H. Williams (born 1944), Pennsylvania State Senate
Dale C. Williams (died 1955), California State Senate
David L. Williams (politician) (born 1953), Kentucky State Senate
David Rogerson Williams (1776–1830), South Carolina State Senate
Derwood Williams (1889–1973), Missouri State Senate
Donald E. Williams Jr. (born 1957), Connecticut State Senate
Eddie Joe Williams (born 1954), Arkansas State Senate
Gardner D. Williams (1804–1858), Michigan State Senate
George Williams (Michigan politician) (1869–1934), Michigan State Senate
Glen Morgan Williams (1920–2012), Virginia State Senate
Guinn Williams (1871–1948), Texas State Senate
Hardy Williams (1931–2010), Pennsylvania State Senate
Henry D. Williams (1893–1934), New York State Senate
Henry Williams (Massachusetts politician) (1805–1887), Massachusetts State Senate
Hezekiah Williams (1798–1856), Maine State Senate
Hosea Williams (1926–2000), Georgia State Senate
Jack W. Williams (politician) (fl. 2010s), Alabama State Senate
James D. Williams (1808–1880), Indiana State Senate
James M. Williams (1850–1909), Ohio State Senate
James Williams (Delaware politician) (1825–1899), Delaware State Senate
Jim Williams (politician) (1926–2016), Florida State Senate
John F. Williams (American politician) (1885–1963), New York State Senate
John M. S. Williams (1818–1886), Massachusetts State Senate
John Williams (Caswell County, North Carolina) (1740–1804), North Carolina State Senate
John Williams (Salem, New York) (1752–1806), New York State Senate
Joseph H. Williams (1814–1896), Maine State Senate
Joseph R. Williams (1808–1861), Michigan State Senate
Joseph T. Williams (1842–1910), Nevada State Senate
Josiah B. Williams (1810–1883), New York State Senate
Kent M. Williams (born 1960), South Carolina State Senate
Lindon Williams (1932–1989), Texas State Senate
Lindsey Williams, Pennsylvania State Senate
Marmaduke Williams (1774–1850), North Carolina State Senate
Marty Williams (born 1951), Virginia State Senate
Matt Williams (Nebraska politician) (born 1949), Nebraska State Senate
Michael Williams (Georgia politician) (fl. 2010s), Georgia State Senate
Micheal R. Williams (born 1955), Tennessee State Senate
Morgan B. Williams (1831–1903), Pennsylvania State Senate
Myron B. Williams (c. 1817–1884), Wisconsin State Senate
Nelson Williams (politician) (fl. 1860s), Wisconsin State Senate
Nikema Williams (born 1978), Georgia State Senate
Penny Williams (born 1937), Oklahoma State Senate
Phil Williams (Alabama senator) (born 1965), Alabama State Senate
Ray Robinson Williams (1899–1987), South Carolina State Senate
Richard H. Williams (New York politician) (1807–?), New York State Senate
Richard S. Williams, New York State Senate
Sandra Williams, Ohio State Senate
Stephen K. Williams (1819–1916), New York State Senate
Steve Williams (politician) (born 1951), Ohio State Senate
Suzanne Williams (fl. 1970s–2010s), Colorado State Senate
Thomas Williams (Pennsylvania politician) (1806–1872), Pennsylvania State Senate
Tommie Williams (fl. 1990s–2010s), Georgia State Senate
Tommy Williams (Texas politician) (born 1956), Texas State Senate
William B. Williams (politician) (1826–1905), Michigan State Senate